Júlia Lemmertz Dias (born March 18, 1963) is a Brazilian television, film and stage actress.

Biography and career
Júlia was born in Porto Alegre, Rio Grande do Sul, to actors Lineu Dias and Lílian Lemmertz. Her career started when she was a child, and since then, Lemmertz has starred in over 40 soap operas.

Personal life

Lemmertz was married to Álvaro Osório, a Rede Globo executive, from 1986 to 1990, with whom she had a daughter, Luiza (born 1987).
While filming Guerra Sem Fim (1993), Lemmertz began a relationship with actor Alexandre Borges. The couple were married in 1993 and have a son, Miguel (born 2000). They divorced in 2015.

Lemmertz has practiced Transcendental Meditation since 1983 and says, "Meditation generates enormous well-being."

Career

Television

Films 

 1982 - As Aventuras de Mário Fofoca
 1984 - Patriamada
 1984 - Mal Star
 1986 - A Cor do Seu Destino .... Patrícia
 1990 - Lua de Cristal .... Lidinha (Maria Lídia)
 1990 - Vaidade
 1993 - Amor Materno
 1995 - Jenipapo .... Júlia
 1997 - Glaura
 1997 - Mangueira - Amor à Primeira Vista
 1998 - A Hora Mágica .... Lúcia
 1999 - Um Copo de Cólera
 1999 - Até que a Vida Nos Separe .... Maria
 1999 - Amor Que Fica
 1999 - Tiradentes … Antônia
 2001 - Nelson Gonçalves .... Lourdinha Bittencourt
 2002 - Joana e Marcelo, Amor (Quase) Perfeito
 2002 - Poeta de Sete Faces
 2003 - Acquária .... Nara 
 2003 - Cristina Quer Casar .... Bia
 2003 - As Três Marias .... Maria Francisca
 2005 - Jogo Subterrâneo .... Laura
 2006 - Gatão de Meia Idade .... Betty
 2007 - Onde Andará Dulce Veiga? .... Lídia
 2008 - Mulheres Sexo Verdades Mentira .... Laura
 2008 - Meu Nome Não É Johnny .... Maria Lu
 2009 - Bela Noite Para Voar .... Letícia
 2009 - Do Começo ao Fim .... Julieta
 2011 - Amor? .... Alice
 2016 - The Jungle Book .... Raksha (Portuguese voice-over translation)
 2016 - Little Secret .... Heloísa Schurmann

References 

1963 births
Living people
People from Porto Alegre
Brazilian people of German descent
Brazilian telenovela actresses
Brazilian television actresses
Brazilian film actresses
20th-century Brazilian actresses
21st-century Brazilian actresses